Pasimachus depressus is a species of ground beetle in the family Carabidae. It is found in North America.

Subspecies
These two subspecies belong to the species Pasimachus depressus:
 Pasimachus depressus carolinensis Casey
 Pasimachus depressus depressus

References

Further reading

 

Scaritinae
Articles created by Qbugbot
Beetles described in 1787